Kokborok Sahitya Sabha (KBSS) was formed on 8 October 1972, under the leadership of Lt. Alindralal Tripura. Since then, it has been working on the development of Kokborok language of Tripura (Twipra).
KBSS has its offices in Agartala, the state capital.

Current President
The current President of the organization is the writer and performer Nanda Kumar Deb Barma.

Tipra People
Quote: "The history of the Tipras' is one of the oldest ones in the world. About 8000 - 12000 years ago (i.e. the period between 10,000 B.C and 6,000 B.C) in the middle of the stone-age, Caucasians and Mongolians entered this country through the western border and the north-eastern border of India respectively.1 In the last division of this age, pottery and agriculture were introduced in human society."

See also
 Kokborok language
 Kokborok tei Hukumu Mission

External links
 borokpeople.com official website of Kokborok Sahitya Sabha.

Tripuri culture
Kokborok
Organizations established in 1972
1972 establishments in Tripura